Brahim Chibout (24 March 1927 – 1 August 2015) was the Algerian minister for veterans in the 1992 government of Belaid Abdessalam. Chibout was a leader in the National Liberation Army, the military wing of the nationalist movement that fought for Algerian independence from France in the Algerian War.

References 

1927 births
2015 deaths
Algerian politicians
21st-century Algerian people